Nariyamulla Grama Niladhari Division is a Grama Niladhari Division of the Divulapitiya Divisional Secretariat of Gampaha District of Western Province, Sri Lanka. It has Grama Niladhari Division Code 42A.

Nariyamulla is a surrounded by the Halpe, Gurullagama, Kithulwala Ihala, Kaluaggala Pahalagama, Kaluaggala and Kuleegedara Grama Niladhari Divisions.

Demographics

Ethnicity 
The Nariyamulla Grama Niladhari Division has a Sinhalese majority (100.0%). In comparison, the Divulapitiya Divisional Secretariat (which contains the Nariyamulla Grama Niladhari Division) has a Sinhalese majority (99.0%)

Religion 
The Nariyamulla Grama Niladhari Division has a Buddhist majority (99.6%). In comparison, the Divulapitiya Divisional Secretariat (which contains the Nariyamulla Grama Niladhari Division) has a Buddhist majority (85.1%) and a significant Roman Catholic population (13.4%)

References 

Grama Niladhari Divisions of Divulapitiya Divisional Secretariat